Dozing-off is a 2012 play by Ali Nassirian which depicts the relationship between an actor and his wife on a journey. Mohsen Moeini worked on the project as a dramaturgist, using "Memories of Destruction", a series of paintings by Aydin Aghdashloo. The play premiered in autumn 2012, and ran for two months in Niavaran Cultural Center. It was directed by Mohsen Moeini, produced by Negin Mirhasani Vahed, and starred Ali Nassirian and Mahboobeh Bayat. The music was composed by Ali Ghamsari.

References

2012 plays
Books about Iran
Persian-language books